The University of Electronic Science and Technology of China (UESTC) is a national public research university in Chengdu, Sichuan, China. It was founded in 1956 instructed by the Premier Zhou Enlai. UESTC was established on the basis of the incorportation of electronics divisions of then three universities including Jiaotong University (now Shanghai Jiao Tong University and Xi'an Jiaotong University), Nanjing Institute of Technology (now Southeast University), and South China Institute of Technology (now South China University of Technology). UESTC was supported by the Double First Class University Plan, 985 Project and 211 Project of China. Now UESTC is a multidisciplinary research university with electronic science and technology as its nucleus, engineering as its major field, and featured with management, liberal art and medicine. 

It has 23 schools and 65 undergraduate majors (13 of them are national-level featured majors). In 2022, UESTC has more than 40,000 students and 3,800 faculties.

History
In 1956 summer, under the instruction of Premier Zhou Enlai, the inception of Chengdu Institute of Radio Engineering (CIRE) ushered in the first higher education institution of electronic and information science and technology of China. CIRE was then created from the combination of electronics-allied divisions of three well-established universities: Shanghai Jiao Tong University, Southeast University (then Nanjing Institute of Technology) and South China University of Technology. As early as the 1960s, it was ranked as one of the nation's key higher education institutions, which represents the importance of this university. In 1988, CIRE was renamed University of Electronic Science and Technology of China (USETC). In 1997, UESTC was selected as one of the top 100 key universities by the "State's Education Revival Project" (Project 211). In 2000, UESTC was transferred to the MoE-university system, hence a national key university directly affiliated to the State's Ministry of Education. In 2001, UESTC was selected as one of the 39 research-intensive universities in China that gain special funding under "project 985" for developing into world-class universities. In 2007, the new campus Qingshuihe was put into use. In 2017, UESTC has been included in the state Double First Class University Plan as a Class A Double First Class University.

Today, UESTC has developed into a multidisciplinary university directly reporting to the Ministry of Education, which has electronic information science and technology as its nucleus, science and engineering as its major field, and incorporates management, economics, medicine and liberal arts. UESTC has more than 3,800 faculty members, of whom 8 are academicians of CAS & CAE, 325 full professors, and 483 associate professors, 21 IEEE Fellows, 121 "Thousand Talents Program" recipients, and 15 Elsevier highly cited scholars.

Academic schools
Built on the Stanford Model and as a member of both the "Project 985" and the "Project 211", UESTC is an electronics-centered multidisciplinary leading research university, covering all of the 6 National Key Disciplines categorized for higher education in electronic and information science and technology in China and a broad range of subjects. In 1984 and 2018, many of the schools are reorganized.

In addition to academic schools, UESTC established seven academic institutes:

UESTC also has two independent colleges: Chengdu colledge and Zhongshan Institute.

Academics and Rankings

China Discipline Evaluation by the Ministry of Education of China 
The China Discipline Evaluation (CDE) is the official assessment of the quality of disciplines (grouped into 14 domains and 113 first-level disciplines) in China and is one of the most important rankings for Chinese universities. The CDE is conducted every ~5 years starting in 2002. Ranking rule of the fourth CDE: A+ is among the top 2%, A is 2%-5%, A- is 5%-10%, B+ is 10%-20%, B is 20%-30%, B- is 30%-40%, C+ is 40%-50%, C is 50%-60%, and C- is 60%-70%. Previous CDEs are evaluated by a score of 0-100.

General Rankings
According to College and university rankings, ARWU, QS, and THE are three most established and influential global rankings.

National Rankings 

Global Ranking of UESTC by U.S News & World Report 

Global Ranking of UESTC by Academic Ranking of World Universities (ARWU)

National Key Disciplines
 Communication and Information System
 Signal and Information Processing
 Circuit and System
 Electromagnetic Field and Microwave Technology
 Microelectronics and Solid-State Electronics Physical Electronics
 Optical Engineering
 Applied Computer Technology

Research Strength

State Key Laboratories 
SKL of Communication Technology
SKL of Electronic Thin Film and Integrated Devices
SKL of Microwave Devices
SKL of High Power Radiation
SKL of Ultra-High Frequency Complicated System

University Research Centers 
Big Data Center
Robot Research Center
Medical Information Center
Photoelectric Detection and Sensor Integration Technology Research Center
IC Research Center
Earth Science Information Center
Cyberspace Security Research Center

Students

National Electronic Designing Contest: Top scoring team since 2005  
6 first prizes and ranked 1st among 729 competing universities (2007)
6 first prizes and ranked 1st among 790 competing universities the only NEC Cup winner (2009) 
Ranked 1st in the National Postgraduate Electronic Design Contest (2010)
11 first prizes and ranked 2nd among 1044 competing universities (2013)
10 first prizes and ranked 1st among 805 competing universities (2015)

The Asia-Pacific Robot Contest (ABU Robocon)
Champion in ABU Robocon (China-site), July, 2010; 2012; 2013; 2015
Champion in ABU Robocon (final in Egypt), Sept, 2010
Champion in ABU Robocon (final in HK), Aug, 2012

Mathematical Modeling Contest  
No.1 in National Mathematic Modeling Contest for University Students (2004, 2006, 2015)
Outstanding Winner in American MCM & ICM (2004, 2011, 2012, 2014)

International Genetic Engineering Machine Competition, iGEM 
Gold Medal at Asia-Pacific site, 2013, 2014
Gold Medal in the world final at MIT, 2013, 2014

International collaboration

International Cooperation 
UESTC has collaborative and solid relationships with over 200 universities and research institutes in 67 countries, as reflected in visits for academic purposes, joint research and joint application of research projects, joint academic conferences and workshops, joint supervisions of Master and Ph.D. degrees and student exchange programs. There are over 1000 students from 67 countries study for bachelor, master and Ph.D degrees in UESTC as well as over 500 short term international students in UESTC every year.

Joint Education Projects authorized by the MOE 
International MBA Joint Program by UESTC and Webster University (USA, 2003)
DBA Joint Program by UESTC and ISCTE (Portugal, 2009)
AF-Chengdu: UESTC-Alliance Française Joint Center of French Training (2003)
Glasgow College, UESTC (with University of Glasgow, UK, 2013)
UESTC - University of Montpellier Confucius Institute (France, 2013)
UESTC - KTH Joint Master's Programs on SoC (Sweden, 2016)

Campus
UESTC now has three campuses—Qingshuihe, Shahe and Jiulidi, occupying a total of 16.6 km² (4100 acres). The three campuses are located in Chengdu.

Notable alumni
Sun Yafang, Chairwoman, Huawei
Ding Lei, Chairman, NetEase
 Yisa Yu, Singer
 Robert Qiu - electrical engineer and entrepreneur

References

External links
UESTC official website (Chinese)
UESTC official website (English)

 
Universities and colleges in Chengdu
Educational institutions established in 1956
Project 985
1956 establishments in China